The 1966 VFL Golden Fleece Night Premiership was the Victorian Football League end of season cup competition played in September of the 1966 VFL Premiership Season. Run as a knock-out tournament, it was contested by the eight VFL teams that failed to make the 1966 VFL finals series. It was the eleventh VFL Night Series competition. Games were played at the Lake Oval, Albert Park, then the home ground of South Melbourne, as it was the only ground equipped to host night games. North Melbourne won its second night series cup in a row defeating Hawthorn in the final by 53 points.

Three rule changes, all of which were eventually permanently adopted in the VFL, were trialled during this series:,
A free kick was awarded against a player if the ball was kicked out of bounds on the full. Adopted in 1969.
A 50yd square was drawn in the centre of the ground, and no more than four players from each team were allowed within the square during a centre bounce; this was to reduce congestion at centre bounces. Adopted in a modified form in 1973.
The number of boundary umpires was increased from two to four. Adopted in 2008.

Games

Round 1

|- bgcolor="#CCCCFF"
| Winning team
| Winning team score
| Losing team
| Losing team score
| Ground
| Crowd
| Date
|- bgcolor="#FFFFFF"
| 
| 14.12 (96)
| 
| 11.20 (86)
| Lake Oval
| 15,700
| Thursday, 1 September
|- bgcolor="#FFFFFF"
| 
| 14.12 (96)
| 
| 11.10 (76)
| Lake Oval
| 10,200
| Tuesday, 6 September
|- bgcolor="#FFFFFF"
| 
| 10.13 (73)
| 
| 9.16 (70)
| Lake Oval
| 13,800
| Thursday, 8 September
|- bgcolor="#FFFFFF"
| 
| 9.14 (68)
| 
| 9.5 (59)
| Lake Oval
| 9,100
| Thursday, 15 September

Semi-finals

|- bgcolor="#CCCCFF"
| Winning team
| Winning team score
| Losing team
| Losing team score
| Ground
| Crowd
| Date
|- bgcolor="#FFFFFF"
| 
| 13.12 (90)
| 
| 12.15 (87)
| Lake Oval
| 14,200
| Monday, 19 September
|- bgcolor="#FFFFFF"
| 
| 13.10 (88)
| 
| 8.12 (60)
| Lake Oval
| 10,100
| Wednesday, 21 September

Final

|- bgcolor="#CCCCFF"
| Winning team
| Winning team score
| Losing team
| Losing team score
| Ground
| Crowd
| Date
|- bgcolor="#FFFFFF"
| 
| 20.12 (132)
| 
| 12.7 (79)
| Lake Oval
| 22,800
| Monday, 26 September

See also

List of Australian Football League night premiers
1966 VFL season

References

External links
 1966 VFL Night Premiership - detailed review including quarter-by-quarter scores, best players and goalkickers for each match

Australian Football League pre-season competition